James Michael Weatherwax (born January 9, 1943) is a former American football player.  He played professionally as a defensive tackle in the National Football League (NFL) for the Green Bay Packers.  He played college football at San Bernardino Valley College, California State University, Los Angeles and West Texas A&M University. 

Weatherwax was drafted by the Packers in the 11th round with the 150th overall pick of the 1965 NFL draft. He played 34 games during three seasons, 1966, 1967, and 1969, with Green Bay. Weatherwax was a member of Green Bay's Super Bowl I  and Super Bowl II championship teams.

Football career
Weatherwax played basketball under Jerry Tarkanian at Redlands High School and also played football. A two-way player, Weatherwax was named to the San Bernardino County all-star team in 1960. He grew ten inches between his sophomore and senior years. In college, Weatherwax started at the two-year San Bernardino Valley College and later stopped at West Texas A&M University and Cal State-Los Angeles.

Weatherwax was drafted in the 11th round (150th overall) of the 1966 NFL Draft by the Green Bay Packers. He was also drafted by the San Diego Chargers in that year's American Football League draft. Weatherwax chose Green Bay for its recent success, claiming that it wasn't much of a choice to make. During his sophomore season in 1967, Weatherwax broke the starting lineup for three games after injuries to the two players above him on the depth chart, Lionel Aldridge and Bob Brown. Weatherwax played through broken ribs in the 1967 season at the behest of coach Vince Lombardi. He played in both Super Bowl I and Super Bowl II as a reserve. Weatherwax saw playing time on the defensive line and on special teams. He was credited with making the first tackle in Super Bowl history with a tackle on the opening kickoff return in Super Bowl I. He did not play in 1968 after having knee surgery in September; he returned to practice the following July.

After the 1969 season, Weatherwax was out of the NFL due to knee injuries. Green Bay waived him on September 3, 1970 and the St. Louis Cardinals conditionally picked Weatherwax up, although he failed a physical and the team declined to sign him.

After football
Weatherwax postponed his wedding, initially scheduled for December 1966, due to the Packers deep playoff run that season. After his football career was over, Weatherwax worked as a manager and was part owner of a Marie Callendar's restaurant in El Toro, California. Weatherwax moved to Loveland, Colorado, and became an avid bass fisherman.

References

External links
 Cal State-Los Angeles HOF profile

1943 births
Living people
American football defensive tackles
Cal State Los Angeles Diablos football players
Green Bay Packers players
West Texas A&M Buffaloes football players
People from Porterville, California
People from Redlands, California
People from Loveland, Colorado
Players of American football from California
Sportspeople from San Bernardino County, California
Sportspeople from Tulare County, California